The Laryngoscope is a monthly peer-reviewed medical journal in the field of otolaryngology. It was established in 1896 and is published by Wiley-Blackwell on behalf of the Triological Society. The editor-in-chief is Samuel H. Selesnick (Weill Cornell Medical College). According to the Journal Citation Reports, the journal has a 2017 impact factor of 2.442, ranking it 12th out of 41 journals in the category "Otorhinolaryngology".

References

External links
 

Otorhinolaryngology journals
Publications established in 1896
Wiley-Blackwell academic journals
Monthly journals
English-language journals